Scythris mariannae is a moth of the family Scythrididae. It was described by Bengt Å. Bengtsson in 1997. It is found in Spain and France.

Etymology
The species name is dedicated to the wife of the author, Mari-Ann.

References

mariannae
Moths described in 1997
Moths of Europe